South Korean player Lee Hyung-taik dominated the nine first years of competition at the event, winning seven titles in singles, and another in doubles. He was the champion in 2009, but he didn't defend his title, because retired due to left thigh injury in his match against Cho Soong-jae already in the first round.
Lukáš Lacko won in the final 6–4, 6–2, against Dušan Lojda.

Seeds

Draw

Finals

Top half

Bottom half

References
 Main Draw
 Qualifying Draw

Samsung Securities Cup - Singles
2009 Singles